Paarl Cricket Club Ground  is a cricket ground in Boland, South Africa.  The first recorded match on the ground was in 1960, when Western Province Combined XI Women hosted the touring England women.  Boland used the ground on four occasions during the 1994–95 Castle Cup.

External links
 Paarl Cricket Club Ground at CricketArchive

Cricket grounds in South Africa
Sports venues in the Western Cape
Paarl